In mathematics, in the theory of several complex variables and complex manifolds, a Stein manifold is a complex submanifold of the vector space of n complex dimensions. They were introduced by and named after . A Stein space is similar to a Stein manifold but is allowed to have singularities. Stein spaces are the analogues of affine varieties or affine schemes in algebraic geometry.

Definition 
Suppose  is a complex manifold of complex dimension  and let  denote the ring of holomorphic functions on  We call  a Stein manifold if the following conditions hold:

  is holomorphically convex, i.e. for every compact subset , the so-called holomorphically convex hull,

Non-compact Riemann surfaces are Stein manifolds

Let X be a connected, non-compact Riemann surface. A deep theorem of Heinrich Behnke and Stein (1948) asserts that X is a Stein manifold.

Another result, attributed to Hans Grauert and Helmut Röhrl (1956), states moreover that every holomorphic vector bundle on X is trivial. In particular, every line bundle is trivial, so . The exponential sheaf sequence leads to the following exact sequence:

 

Now Cartan's theorem B shows that , therefore .

This is related to the solution of the second Cousin problem.

Properties and examples of Stein manifolds 
 The standard complex space  is a Stein manifold.

 It can be shown quite easily that every closed complex submanifold of a Stein manifold is a Stein manifold, too.

 The embedding theorem for Stein manifolds states the following: Every Stein manifold  of complex dimension  can be embedded into  by a biholomorphic proper map.

These facts imply that a Stein manifold is a closed complex submanifold of complex space, whose complex structure is that of the ambient space (because the embedding is biholomorphic).

 Every Stein manifold of (complex) dimension n has the homotopy type of an n-dimensional CW-complex.

 In one complex dimension the Stein condition can be simplified: a connected Riemann surface is a Stein manifold if and only if it is not compact.  This can be proved using a version of the Runge theorem for Riemann surfaces, due to Behnke and Stein.

 Being a Stein manifold is equivalent to being a (complex) strongly pseudoconvex manifold. This is a solution to the so-called Levi problem, named after Eugenio Levi (1911). The function  invites a generalization of Stein manifold to the idea of a corresponding class of compact complex manifolds with boundary called Stein domains. A Stein domain is the preimage . Some authors call such manifolds therefore strictly pseudoconvex manifolds.

Related to the previous item, another equivalent and more topological definition in complex dimension 2 is the following: a Stein surface is a complex surface X with a real-valued Morse function f on X such that, away from the critical points of f, the field of complex tangencies to the preimage  is a contact structure that induces an orientation on Xc agreeing with the usual orientation as the boundary of  That is,  is a Stein filling of Xc.

Numerous further characterizations of such manifolds exist, in particular capturing the property of their having "many" holomorphic functions taking values in the complex numbers. See for example Cartan's theorems A and B, relating to sheaf cohomology. The initial impetus was to have a description of the properties of the domain of definition of the (maximal) analytic continuation of an analytic function.

In the GAGA set of analogies, Stein manifolds correspond to affine varieties.

Stein manifolds are in some sense dual to the elliptic manifolds in complex analysis which admit "many" holomorphic functions from the complex numbers into themselves.  It is known that a Stein manifold is elliptic if and only if it is fibrant in the sense of so-called "holomorphic homotopy theory".

Relation to smooth manifolds 

Every compact smooth manifold of dimension 2n, which has only handles of index ≤ n, has a Stein structure provided n > 2, and when n = 2 the same holds provided the 2-handles are attached with certain framings (framing less than the Thurston–Bennequin framing). Every closed smooth 4-manifold is a union of two Stein 4-manifolds glued along their common boundary.

Notes

References 

 (including a proof of Behnke-Stein and Grauert–Röhrl theorems)

 (including a proof of the embedding theorem)
 (definitions and constructions of Stein domains and manifolds in dimension 4)

Complex manifolds